Hyellaceae is a family of cyanobacteria.

The genus name of Hyella is in honour of Félix Charles Hy (1853-1918), who was a French clergyman and Botanist (Mycology, Algology and Bryology).

References

Pleurocapsales
Cyanobacteria families